Rob Parry is an English actor who appeared as convicted rapist Frank Bernard Hartbourne on ITV soap opera Emmerdale in 2004. Before this he appeared in an episode of ITV medical drama The Royal in 2003. In 2005 he appeared in three episodes of ITV soap opera Coronation Street as a photographer.

External links

Living people
English male television actors
Year of birth missing (living people)
Place of birth missing (living people)